Australia Square Tower is an office and retail complex in the central business district of Sydney.  Its main address is 264 George Street, and the Square is bounded on the northern side by Bond Street, eastern side by Pitt Street and southern side by Curtin Place.

Description and history
The building was first conceived in 1961, and its final design by Harry Seidler & Associates was in 1964 after collaboration with structural engineer Pier Luigi Nervi. Today, it remains a landmark building in Sydney and is regarded as iconic to Australian architecture. It has even been described as the most beautiful building in Australia, though it is not without criticism. The outstanding feature of the Square is the Tower Building; from its completion in 1967 until 1976 was the tallest building in Sydney.

Australia Square is jointly owned by the GPT Group and Dexus. During the mid-1990s the building was completely refurbished. Another $11 million refurbishment program, which included replacing all paving in public areas with Italian porphyry paving stone, new lighting and outdoor tables was conducted in 2003.

The Tower

Design
Australia Square was constructed shortly after height restrictions were lifted in the city of Sydney and at a time when small sites, including blocks created by laneways, were being consolidated into larger blocks to accommodate high-rise office towers.

It was the world's tallest lightweight concrete building at the time it was built. The circular plan of the main tower allowed Seidler to minimise what he called "the dark canyon effect", an approach further helped by setting the tower back from the street.

The original proposal included 58 floors; however, this was reduced to 50. On the 47th floor is a revolving restaurant called The Summit and the 48th floor houses an observation deck. The building contains one of Sydney's largest basement car parks with spaces for 400 vehicles. The major tenants of the Tower include Origin Energy, HWL Ebsworth and ninemsn.

Construction

The project was instigated by Dick Dusseldorp, the founder of Lend Lease.

Australia Square was constructed by Civil & Civic. Construction, starting with demolition of the old buildings, began in 1961.

The tower is constructed of lightweight concrete, with 20 projecting vertical columns tapering to the summit and supporting a combination of interlocking rib-structured reinforcement and radial support beams. The core contains elevator shafts, emergency stairwells and service conduits. Construction time for each floor was five working days—a new standard in office tower construction.

Other features
Facing Pitt Street is the 13-storey Plaza Building, a comparatively simple rectangular office building (designed 1961, construction started 1962, completed 1964). The Plaza Building was devised to be completed and generate rental income while the round tower was being constructed.

Alongside the Tower Building sits a large abstract steel sculpture by Alexander Calder. There is also a sculpture by Seward Johnson Jr, Waiting.  The tower ground floor lobby had tapestries by Le Corbusier and Victor Vasarely on display; however, due to fading, those pieces were removed and replaced in 2003 with a mural by Sol LeWitt. The former Lend Lease executive floor in the tower also had many artworks specified by Harry Seidler: the reception area displayed a sculpture by Norman Carlberg and tapestries by John Olsen and Le Corbusier, the executive floor suites also had a tapestry by Miro and artwork by Alexander Calder.

Extensive public open space, including fountains, is a feature of the Square. This design feature is an early example of including a public open space on private land. There are numerous entrances to the retail precincts in the lower ground level of the Tower, which include a post office and food outlets.  The retail target is the office worker on a lunch break, and the open-plan design and ease of access have been styled accordingly.

Surpassing of height
The Australia Square Tower building was the tallest building in Sydney for nine years. Right across George Street from Australia Square is the  Suncorp Building, which opened in 1982 as the Qantas Building.

Awards 
The building won the Sir John Sulman Medal for its innovative and appealing design in 1967. In 2012, Australia Square was awarded the "Enduring Architecture: National Award" by the Australian Institute of Architects.

Major tenants
 O Bar and Dining
 Dexus
 HWL Ebsworth
 ninemsn
 VMtech

See also

Australian non-residential architectural styles
List of tallest buildings in Sydney

References

External links
 Australia Square Online
 

1967 establishments in Australia
Buildings and structures awarded the Sir John Sulman Medal
Buildings and structures with revolving restaurants
Harry Seidler buildings
Pier Luigi Nervi buildings
Modernist architecture in Australia
Office buildings completed in 1967
Office buildings in Sydney
Retail buildings in New South Wales
Skyscraper office buildings in Australia
Skyscrapers in Sydney
Sydney central business district